The Isle of Man to England Interconnector is a submarine power cable connecting the transmission system of the Manx Electricity Authority to that of Great Britain.

Route 
It was laid in 1999 between Bispham, Blackpool, England, and Douglas Head on the Isle of Man,  commencing commercial operations in November 2000. It is capable of continuous operation of 40MW at 90kV (although other sources say 65MW at 132kV AC)

Structure 
The cable was manufactured in two parts: one section at the former BICC works in Erith and the other at Pirelli Cables in Southampton. It ended the Isle of Man's dependence on local diesel-powered generation. Power supplies to the island were increased in 2003 by an 85MW combined cycle gas turbine power station at Pulrose, in the capital, Douglas.

The electricity cable is bundled with a fibre optic cable which is used for telecommunications. The cable is owned by e-llan Communications, which is part of Manx Utilities. The electricity cable is used for importing and exporting electricity between the Isle of Man and the GB National Grid.

The cable is mostly buried at around  depth but is on the seabed surface at six locations with protective cable mattresses.

Capacity 
On the 20th anniversary in 2020 of its commissioning a total of 1.5TWh of power has been exported to the UK grid which contributed £47million to the revenue of the Isle of Man.

The amount of electricity sold to the UK since 201415 and the revenue gained each year was as follows:

See also
Western HVDC Link between Scotland and Wales
HVDC Moyle between Scotland and Northern Ireland
East–West Interconnector between Wales and the Republic of Ireland
Manx Utilities Authority

Notes

References

Electrical interconnectors to and from Great Britain
Buildings and structures in the Isle of Man
Buildings and structures in Blackpool
Electric power infrastructure in England
Energy infrastructure completed in 1999
1999 establishments in the United Kingdom
Isle of Man–United Kingdom relations
High-voltage transmission lines